is a railway station operated by Meitetsu's  Kōwa Line located in Handa, Aichi Prefecture,  Japan. It is located 16.8 rail kilometers from the terminus of the line at Ōtagawa Station.

History
Aoyama Station was opened on July 10, 1933, as on the Chita Railway. The Chita Railway became part of the Meitetsu group on February 2, 1943.  A new station building was completed in April 1993. On January 29, 2005, the station was renamed to its present name. In July 2006, the Tranpass system of magnetic fare cards with automatic turnstiles was implemented, and the station became unattended after that date. The station building was reconstructed in 2010.

Lines
Meitetsu
Kōwa Line

Layout
Aoyama Station has two opposed side platforms.

Platforms

Adjacent stations

References

External links
  Meitetsu Station information
 

Railway stations in Japan opened in 1933
Stations of Nagoya Railroad
Railway stations in Aichi Prefecture